The 1988 Tour de France was the 75th edition of Tour de France, one of cycling's Grand Tours. The Tour began in Pornichet with a prelude stage of team and individual time trials on 3 July, and Stage 11 occurred on 13 July with a mountainous stage to Morzine. The race finished on the Champs-Élysées in Paris on 24 July.

Prelude

Stage 1
4 July 1988 — Pontchâteau to Machecoul,

Stage 2
4 July 1988 — La Haye-Fouassière to Ancenis,  (team time trial)

Stage 3
5 July 1988 — Nantes to Le Mans,

Stage 4
6 July 1988 — Le Mans to Évreux,

Stage 5
7 July 1988 — Neufchâtel-en-Bray to Liévin,

Stage 6
8 July 1988 — Liévin to Wasquehal,  (individual time trial)

Stage 7
9 July 1988 — Wasquehal to Reims,

Stage 8
10 July 1988 — Reims to Nancy,

Stage 9
11 July 1988 — Nancy to Strasbourg,

Stage 10
12 July 1988 — Belfort to Besançon,

Stage 11
13 July 1988 — Besançon to Morzine,

References

1988 Tour de France
Tour de France stages